Lorenzo Lodici (born 16 April 2000) is an Italian chess grandmaster. He is an Italian Champion in 2018 and winner of chess' Mitropa Cup in 2021. He represented Italian Team at Chess Olympiads in 2022 and at Online Chess Olympiads in 2020.

Career 
Lodici was born in Brescia, but he grew up in Chioggia, a town near Venice. After gaining the title of International Master in 2016, he won the Italian Junior Championship in Cosenza in 2017.

In 2018, he won the Italian Chess Championship for the first time in Salerno, defeating the Grandmaster Alberto David in the play-offs by 2-0. Here he earned the first Grandmaster norm.

In 2021, he got the other two norms, gaining the Grandmaster title. The first at the Festival Holiday La Marca Open in Villorba in June, the second at Italian Team Chess Championship in Montesilvano in September. In April he won the Mitropa Cup with the Italian Team, playing in reserve board. He scored 4.5 out of 7 points.

In 2022, he participated at his first Chess Olympiad in Chennai, where he obtained the 19th performance rating in 3rd board, defeating the Norwegian Super GM Jon Ludvig Hammer and drawing against the Indian child prodigy R Praggnanandhaa.

References

External links 

Lorenzo Lodici chess games at 365Chess.com

2000 births
Living people
Chess grandmasters
Italian chess players
Chess Olympiad competitors